

Sovereign states

A
 Aceh - Sultanate of Aceh
 Ahom - Ahom Kingdom
Algiers - Sultanate of Algiers
 Andorra - Principality of Andorra
 Ankole - Kingdom of Ankole
Anziku - Anziku Kingdom
 Aragon - Kingdom of Aragon
Arakan - Kingdom of Arakan
 Asahan - Sultanate of Asahan
 Ayutthaya - Kingdom of Ayutthaya

B
Bacan - Sultanate of Bacan
Badakhshan - Khanate of Badakhshan
Badung - Kingdom of Badung
 Bamberg - Prince-Bishopric of Bamberg
Bamoun - Bamoun Sultanate
Bangkalan - State of Bangkalan
Banjarmasin - Sultantate of Banjarmasin
Banten - Sultanate of Banten
 Basel - Prince-Bishopric of Basel
Bemba - Bemba Kingdom
 Benin - Benin Empire
Bhadgaon - Kingdom of Bhadgaon
Bhutan - Bhutan
Bijapur - Bijapur Sultanate
Bijayapur - Bijayapur Kingdom
 Bila - Bila Sultanate
Bima - Sultanate of Bima
Bone - Sultanate of Bone
 - Sultanate of Brunei
 Buganda - Kingdom of Buganda
 Bukhara - Khanate of Bukhara
Buleleng - Kingdom of Buleleng
 Bunyoro - Kingdom of Bunyoro-Kitara
Burma - Kingdom of Burma
Burundi - Kingdom of Burundi
Buton - Sultanate of Buton
Butua - Kingdom of Butua

C
Cambodia - Kingdom of Cambodia
 Catalonia - Principality of Catalonia
China - Great Qing Empire
Chitradurga - Chitradurga Nayak Kingdom
Chitral - Kingdom of Chitral under the Katoor Dynasty
Cianjur - State of Cianjur
Cirebon - Sultanate of Cirebon
 Cospaia - Republic of Cospaia
 Cossack Hetmanate - Zaporizhian Host
 Crimea - Crimean Khanate

D
Dahomey - Kingdom of Dahomey
Dauro - Kingdom of Dauro
Dendi - Kingdom of Dendi
 - Kingdom of Denmark and Norway
 - Republic of the Seven United Netherlands

E
 England, Scotland and Ireland - Commonwealth of England, Scotland and Ireland (to May 8)
Ennarea - Kingdom of Ennarea
Ethiopia - Empire of Ethiopia

F
 - Kingdom of France

G
Garo - Kingdom of Garo
  Geneva - Republic of Geneva
 - Most Serene Republic of Genoa
Gianyar - Kingdom of Gianyar
Golconda - Golconda Sultanate
Gorkha - Kingdom of Gorkha
Gowa - Sultanate of Gowa
/Union of Crowns (from May 8)

H
Harar - Sultanate of Harar
 - Holy Roman Empire
 Hungary - Kingdom of Hungary
 Hunza - Principality of Hunza

I
Imereti - Kingdom of Imereti
 Ireland - Kingdom of Ireland (from May 8)
Itza - Kingdom of the Itza Maya

J
 Jambi - State of Jambi
Janjero - Kingdom of Janjero
Japan - Tokugawa shogunate
Jaxa
Jimma - Kingdom of Jimma
 Johor-Riau - Sultanate of Johor-Riau

K
Kaffa - Kingdom of Kaffa
 Kakheti - Kingdom of Kakheti
 Kalat - Khanate of Kalat
Kampong Raja - Sultanate of Kampong Raja
Karagwe - Kingdom of Karagwe
Kartli - Kingdom of Kartli
Kashgar - Khanate of Kashgar
 Kathmandu - Kingdom of Kathmandu
Kazakh Khanate - Kazakh Khanate
 - Negeri Kedah Darul Aman (to September)
Keladi - Keladi Nayaka Kingdom
 Khiva - Khanate of Khiva
 Klungkung - Kingdom of Klungkung
 Kongo - Kingdom of Kongo
Konta - Kingdom of Konta
 Korea - Kingdom of Joseon
 Kota Pinang - Sultanate of Kota Pinang

L
Ladakh - Kingdom of Ladakh
 Lan Xang - Kingdom of Lan Xang
 Landak - State of Landak
Limbangan - State of Limbangan (from 1660)
Loango - Kingdom of Loango
Luba - Luba Empire
Lucca - Republic of Lucca
Lunda - Lunda Kingdom
Luwu - Kingdom of Luwu

M
Madurai - Madurai Nayak Kingdom
 Mainz - Archbishopric of Mainz
Majeerteen - Sultanate of Majeerteen
 Malta - Order of Saint John 
Mandara - Mandara Kingdom
 Mantua - Duchy of Mantua
Mataram - Mataram Sultanate
 Milan - Duchy of Milan
Minangkabau - Minangkabau Kingdom
Mindanao - Sultanate of Maguindanao
Mingrelia - Principality of Mingrelia
Modena - Duchy of Modena and Reggio
Mogadishu - Sultanate of Mogadishu
Moldavia - Principality of Moldavia
Mongolia - Mongolian Empire
 - Sultanate of Morocco
Mrauk U - Kingdom of Mrauk U
 Mughal Empire - Mughal Empire
 Muscat - Sultanate of Muscat
 Mustang - Kingdom of Mustang
Mutapa - Kingdom of Mutapa
 Mysore - Kingdom of Mysore

N
Nagar - Principality of Nagar
Naning - State of Naning
 Naples -  Kingdom of Naples
 - Kingdom of Norway (Province of Denmark, nominally in personal union)

O
 - Ottoman Empire
Oyo - Oyo Empire

P
 - Negeri Pahang Darul Makmur
 Palembang - Sultanate of Palembang Darussalam
 Papal States - States of the Church
Papekat - Sultanate of Papekat (from 1660)
 Parma - Duchy of Parma and Piacenza
 Passau - Bishopric of Passau
Patan - Kingdom of Patan
Pattani Kingdom - Sultanate of Pattani and Kelantan 
 - Negeri Perak Darur Ridzwan
 Persia - Persian Empire
Polish–Lithuanian Commonwealth
 - Kingdom of Portugal
 Prussia - Duchy of Prussia

R
Ragusa - Republic of Ragusa
Rapa Nui - Kingdom of Rapa Nui
Rembau - State of Rembau
 Russia - Tsardom of Russia
Rwanda - Kingdom of Rwanda

S
 Sambas - Sultanate of Sambas
 Salé - Republic of Salé
Samoa - Kingdom of Samoa
 - Most Serene Republic of San Marino
Sanggau - Sultanate of Sanggau
 Sardinia - Kingdom of Sardinia
 - Duchy of Savoy
Sekadau - Sultanate of Sekadau
Selambau - State of Selambau
Sheka - Kingdom of Sheka
 Sicily - Kingdom of Sicily
 Sikkim - Kingdom of Sikkim
Soppeng - Kingdom of Soppeng
Southern Ming - Great Ming Empire
 - Kingdom of Spain
 Stavelot-Malmedy - Imperial Abbey of Stavelot and Malmedy
Sukapura - State of Sukapura
Sukadana - Sultanate of Sukadana
Sulu - Sultanate of Sulu
Sumbawa - Sultanate of Sumbawa
Sumedang - State of Sumedang
Sumenep - State of Sumenep
 - Kingdom of Sweden
 Switzerland - Swiss Confederacy

T
Tallo - Sultanate of Tallo
Tanette - State of Tanette
Ternate - Sultanate of Ternate
Thanjavur - Thanjavur Nayak Kingdom
Tibet - Kingdom of Tibet
Tidore - Sultanate of Tidore
Tonga - Tu'i Tonga
Tonkin - Great Viet Realm
 Transylvania - Principality of Transylvania
Tuggurt - Sultanate of Tuggurt
Turpan - Khanate of Turpan
 Tuscany - Grand Duchy of Tuscany

V
 Valencia - Kingdom of Valencia
 - Most Serene Republic of Venice
Viet Nam (Dai Viet) - Later Le Dynasty

W
Wajo - State of Wajo
 Wallachia - Principality of Wallachia
Welayta - Kingdom of Welayta

Non-sovereign territories

England
 English America

Notes

1660